Andrew Frost may refer to:

Andrew Frost (rugby union) (born 1983), English rugby union player
Andrew Frost (hammer thrower), English hammer thrower
Andrew Frost (arts writer); see The Art Life
Andrew Frost, singer with The Magnets
Andrew Frost, character in The Final Deduction

See also
 Andy Frost (disambiguation)